Space jurisdiction, a field addressing what countries can enforce various laws in space, has become more important as the private sector enters the field of space tourism. Under the Outer Space Treaty of 1967, while space and celestial bodies cannot be appropriated by nations, objects launched into space and personnel on board them remain under the jurisdiction of the state of registry.

International treaties 
The majority of international treaties currently in existence address only specific aspects of space.  No major treaties have been passed that have broad, sweeping jurisdiction in space, and it is largely unclear who would enforce such laws.  The treaties currently in existence regarding space law include the following:

The Outer Space Treaty of 1967
The Rescue Agreement of 1968.
The Space Liability Convention of 1972.
The Registration Convention of 1976.

The Moon Treaty of 1979 was proposed after the Outer Space Treaty, but failed to be ratified by any major space-faring nation such as those capable of orbital spaceflight.  If it had been broadly accepted, the result would have been an international regime overseeing extraction of resources from celestial bodies.

Trade in space 
Issues of trade and crime in space have not been debated except with respect to the International Space Station.  Agreements have involved all units in operation including Europe, the United States, Russia, Canada, and Japan.  Three basic levels of agreement include:

International Space Station Intergovernmental Agreement, an international treaty signed on January 29, 1998 by the fifteen governments involved in the Space Station project. This governmental-level document provides for teamwork between the involved countries in a peaceful Space Station.
Four Memoranda of Understanding, an agreement between the National Aeronautics and Space Administration and each co-operating Space Agency: European Space Agency, Canadian Space Agency, Russian Federal Space Agency (Roscosmos), and Japan Aerospace Exploration Agency.  The objective of these space agencies-level agreements is to specify the roles and responsibilities of each agency in the design, development, operation and utilization of the Space Station.

Space marriage 
Space marriage is a relatively unexplored but emerging attraction of space tourism industry in the private sector.  .

On August 10, 2003, Russian cosmonaut Yuri Malenchenko became the first human to marry in space.  A provision in Texas marriage laws, that says one party does not have to be present so long as the couple presents an affidavit explaining why one of the two participants in the ceremony can't attend, allowed Malenchenko to marry his bride, Ekaterina Dmitriev, from the International Space Station.

Other matters of space jurisdiction

Resource extraction

With the failure of the Moon Treaty of 1979 (which would have established a principle of the common heritage of mankind for celestial bodies and required establishing an international regime to supervise use), there is no clear rule regarding the development or use of resources located in space, whether by states or private parties.  The United States has asserted a right for U.S. citizens to own space resources they obtain, per the U.S. Commercial Space Launch Competitiveness Act (H.R. 2262) § 51303:

Criminal law

Prosecution of crimes committed in space, under current law, would be expected to fall under the same mix of claims of jurisdiction by state of registry, nationality of the perpetrator, and nationality of the victim that govern crimes on the high seas or in Antarctica.

At least until recently, the combination of thorough background checks, vigorous training regimes and strict codes of conduct governing professional spacecrew have combined to make it highly unlikely that anyone inclined to and/or intent on engaging in criminal activity would be launched into space.

Furthermore, there is only one known instance of a formal complaint alleging a crime committed from space, which involved a non-space traveling complainant who was the estranged spouse of the accused astronaut. The ensuing investigation exonerated the astronaut and instead resulted in an indictment against the original complainant for making false statements to authorities.

References

www.esa.int
www.spacetoday.org: ISS Wedding
www.space.com/missionlaunches: Space wedding
www.state.gov
www.icc-cpi.int

Space law